The Big Gay Out was a short-lived live popular music event, dance party, and funfair for the LGBT community in Finsbury Park, London. It was held twice, in 2004 as part of London's Gay Pride, and again in 2005 separately from London Pride. There was no Big Gay Out in 2006 due to the Europride celebrations, and a third event planned for 2007 was never held. A portion of the profits made went to charities including Stonewall.

2004 event
The first Big Gay Out music festival held in Finsbury Park was hosted as part of London's Pride events, following the parade. The event had 45 artists scheduled to perform, including the Sugababes, Jamelia and Peter André, along with more than 50 DJs. It also featured an outdoor dance stage cabaret tent and a beach bar.

2005 event
The 2005 Big Gay Out had many reformed bands and come-back artists, including:

McFly
The Wurzels
The Cuban Brothers
Terri Walker
Blazin' Squad
Do Me Bad Things
Tony Christie
Jayme Ephraim
Peter André
Lemar
Carnaval Collection
Beverley Knight
Sunset Strippers
Bananarama
The Porcelain Twinz
Jenny Frost
Killa Kela
The Human League
Electric Six
Girls Aloud
Frankie Goes to Hollywood

Goldfrapp performed in the Popstarz tent

Babyshambles were scheduled to appear but, not entirely unexpectedly, did not show up.

Contestants of the popular show Playing It Straight also made an appearance, as did the 2005 Mr Gay UK finalists. Graham Norton also appeared introducing some acts.

References 

LGBT events in England
Festivals in London
Music festivals in London
LGBT festivals in the United Kingdom